Carstens  may refer to:

 Carstens, surname 
 Carstens Publications, American publisher of books and magazines related to the railroad and airplane hobby fields
 Carstens Shoal, almost circular shoal lying just north of East Budd Island in Holme Bay

See also 

 Carsten (disambiguation)
 Karstens (disambiguation)